The Haas VF-18 is a Formula One car designed by Italian manufacturer Dallara for the Haas F1 Team to compete in the 2018 FIA Formula One World Championship. The car was driven by Romain Grosjean and Kevin Magnussen and made its competitive début at the 2018 Australian Grand Prix.

Design and development
The focus of the VF-18's design was to produce a more stable chassis than its predecessor, the VF-17, with the aim of building a car capable of producing more consistent performances between rounds. To do this, Dallara worked to reduce the weight of the chassis as much as possible, allowing Haas more freedom in using ballast to influence the car's weight distribution.

The car was subject to scrutiny following its performances in pre-season testing and free practice sessions at the 2018 Australian Grand Prix. Team principal Gunther Steiner dismissed the claims, responding to critics by arguing that the team had only purchased parts from Ferrari that the FIA had approved for sale. This was the first Haas car to achieve a fastest lap.

Complete Formula One results
(key) (results in bold indicate pole position; results in italics indicate fastest lap)

References

VF-18